Fahraj (also Romanized as Fahrej), formerly Narmāshīr and Irānshahr, is a city and capital of Fahraj County, Kerman Province, Iran.  At the 2006 census, its population was 6,105, in 1,428 families.

The people are mostly Persians, with a minority of Baluchis.

References

Populated places in Fahraj County

Cities in Kerman Province